

Prairie Central High School is a public four-year high school in the Prairie Central Consolidated School District of central Illinois. It is located in Fairbury, Illinois.

History
The consolidated Prairie Central district was created in 1985 by merging three districts. Those three districts' high schools were Fairbury Cropsey High School, Forrest-Strawn-Wing High School, and Chatsworth High School. Upon completion of the merger, the new district chose to locate their high school in the building that was formerly known as Fairbury-Cropsey Junior-Senior High School, a building that dated from the 1940s. The building that had housed Forrest-Strawn-Wing High School—built just a couple of years prior to consolidation—was chosen to be the location of the new district's junior high school. In 2004 the district expanded further expanded with the addition of the students from the former Chenoa High School.

Upon the change of the school's name, the mascot and school colors were also changed. The new mascot selected was the Hawks, and the new colors were white, Columbia blue, and navy. The previous mascots and colors had been: FCHS Fighting Tartars (green and yellow gold), FSW Fighting Eskimos (red and black), and Chatsworth Bluebirds (blue and orange).

Competition
The 2008 Marching Hawks band place first at the University of Illinois Marching Band Championships.
The Prairie Central FFA's dairy team won nationals in Indiana in 2008.

References

External links
 Official site
 Facebook FSW Group

Public high schools in Illinois
Fairbury, Illinois
Schools in Livingston County, Illinois